USNS Sword Knot (T-AGM-13) was a missile range instrumentation ship which operated as USAFS Sword Knot on the United States Air Force's Eastern Range during the late 1950s and early 1960s. Sword Knot operated under an Air Force contract with Pan American Airways Guided Missile Range Division headquartered in Cocoa Beach, Florida.

Sword Knot, assigned to the South Atlantic Ocean and the Caribbean area, provided the Air Force with metric data on intercontinental ballistic missiles launched from the Cape Canaveral Air Force Station (CCAFS) in Florida as part of the Missile Test Project. It operated in the intercontinental ballistic missile re-entry area near Ascension Island, and was home-ported out of Recife, Brazil.

After transfer to the U.S. Navy's Military Sea Transportation Service, Sword Knot was reassigned to the Western Range and home-ported in Port Hueneme, California. There, she provided data on missiles launched from Vandenberg Air Force Base.

External links 
 Sword Knot at NavSource.com

Missile range instrumentation ships of the United States Navy
Ships built in Los Angeles
1945 ships
World War II merchant ships of the United States
Type C1-M ships of the United States Air Force
Type C1-M ships of the United States Navy
Cold War auxiliary ships of the United States
Signals intelligence
Research vessels of the United States Navy